Freebooters F.C was an association football club from Sandymount, Dublin, Ireland. Their highest achievement was reaching the Irish Cup final which was staged at the City and County Grounds, Jones Road, Dublin, now Croke Park. They lost to Cliftonville F.C., in the first Irish Cup final to be played outside Belfast. Freebooters had beaten Linfield F.C. 2-1 in the semi final at the Jones Road venue.

The club lost 1-0 in the 1900 Leinster Senior Cup final to local rivals Shelbourne F.C.

Freebooters' ground was on the Sandymount Road in Dublin, between the Star of the Sea Church and Ringsend. It was previously leased by the Catholic University Medical School. The club was made up of a number of players who had been to public school in England, such families as the O'Reilly's, McCanns, and Meldons. They were keen cricket players.

In 1906 Shelbourne F.C. began playing their home games on this ground as Freebooters went into decline.

Honours 
Irish Cup runners-up: 1
 1901

Leinster Senior Cup runners-up: 1
 1900

International Players 
Freebooters players represented Ireland at international level in the British Home Championship.
Harry O'Reilly
James V. Nolan-Whelan BL
J. Mansfield

Other clubs named Freebooters
Other soccer clubs have adopted the name Freebooters, in Cork and in Kilkenny. Freebooters (Cork) came runners-up in the FAI Intermediate Cup in 1949 played in the Cork Business and Shipping League, Freebooters(Kilkenny) was formed in 1950 by workers from the Post Office, one of the players had moved from Freebooters in Cork and so they chose the name.

References

Association football clubs disestablished in 1906
Association football clubs in Dublin (city)
Defunct association football clubs in the Republic of Ireland
1906 disestablishments in Ireland